The El-Gendi Fortress is located in the southern portion of the Sinai Peninsula, Egypt.  Originally constructed at the behest of Saladin in 1183 AD, the large fortress includes defensive towers, mosques, residential structures, and the additional defensive fortification of ditches surrounding the site.  The fortress is being considered for inclusion in the World Heritage list of sites with "outstanding universal value" to the world.

World Heritage Status 
This site was added to the UNESCO World Heritage Tentative List on November 1, 1994 in the Cultural category.

Notes

References 
El-Gendi Fortress - UNESCO World Heritage Centre Retrieved 2009-03-04.

Castles in Egypt
Forts in Egypt